Teia is a genus of tussock moths in the family Erebidae first described by Francis Walker in 1855.

Some authors have treated this name as a synonym of Orgyia Ochsenheimer, 1810(e.g.), but molecular analyses suggest that it is a distinct lineage.

Species
Teia anartoides Walker, 1855
Teia athlophora (Turner, 1921)
Teia parallela (Gaede, 1932)
Teia sarramea (Holloway, 1979)

References

Lymantriinae
Moth genera